Aleksandr Yevgenyevich Chernikov (born 1 February 2000) is a Russian football player who plays as a defensive midfielder for FC Krasnodar.

Club career
He made his debut in the Russian Professional Football League for FC Krasnodar-2 on 17 March 2018 in a game against FC Biolog-Novokubansk. He made his Russian Football National League debut for Krasnodar-2 on 22 July 2018 in a game against FC SKA-Khabarovsk.

He made his debut for the main squad of FC Krasnodar on 25 September 2019 in a Russian Cup game against FC Nizhny Novgorod. He made his Russian Premier League debut for Krasnodar on 1 March 2020 in a game against FC Ufa, he started the game and was substituted at half-time.

International career
He was called up to the Russia national football team for the first time in October 2021 for the World Cup qualifiers against Cyprus and Croatia. He was included in the extended 41-players list of candidates.

Career statistics

References

External links
 
 

2000 births
People from Vyselkovsky District
Living people
Russian footballers
Russia youth international footballers
Russia under-21 international footballers
Association football midfielders
FC Krasnodar players
Russian Premier League players
Russian First League players
Russian Second League players
FC Krasnodar-2 players
Sportspeople from Krasnodar Krai